From 1906 to 1926, the Finnish Swimming Federation did not arrange a dedicated national competition, but spread out the hosting duties of the championship events to multiple clubs.

Diving

Men

Plain 
Competed in Helsinki on 2 September 1906.

Source:

Women

Platform 
Competed in Helsinki on 2 September 1906.

Source:

Swimming

Men

100 metre freestyle 
Competed in Vaasa on 28 July 1906.

Sources:

1000 metre freestyle 
Competed in Vaasa on 29 July 1906.

Source:

200 metre breaststroke 
Competed in Vaasa on 28 July 1906.

Source:

Cederberg's time would have been the world record later when FINA was founded, but they refused to ratify it because he wore swimming briefs instead of a racing suit.

Women

100 metre freestyle 
Competed in Helsinki on 22 July 1906.

Source:

Elsa Lingonblad became the first to win an official Finnish championship in aquatics.

Sources

References 

National swimming competitions
National championships in Finland
Swimming competitions in Finland
1906 in Finnish sport
1906 in water sports
Diving competitions in Finland